Q'enqo, Qenko, Kenko, or Quenco (all from Quechua for "zig-zag") is an archaeological site in the Sacred Valley of Peru located in the Cusco Region, Cusco Province, Cusco District, about 6 km north east of Cusco. The site was declared a Cultural Heritage (Patrimonio Cultural) of the Cusco Region by the National Institute of Culture.

It is one of the largest huacas (holy places) in the Cusco Region. Many huacas were based on naturally occurring rock formations. It was believed to be a place where sacrifices and mummification took place.

Gallery

See also 
 Amaru Marka Wasi

References

External links 

Archaeological sites in Cusco Region
Archaeological sites in Peru